William Garner may refer to:

William Garner (novelist) (1920–2005), English novelist
Bill Garner (footballer) (William David Garner, born 1947), English footballer
William Carl Garner (1915–2014), American engineer
Willie Garner (born 1955), Scottish footballer best known for playing for Aberdeen

See also
Bill Garner (disambiguation)

Garner (disambiguation)